The  was a spacecraft which was launched by Japan on March 18, 1995.

Technical data 

The Space Flyer Unit was launched from Tanegashima Space Center from a H-II vehicle. It carried testing materials and research data that held value to NASA. The crew of STS-72 aboard Space Shuttle Endeavour retrieved the satellite on January 20, 1996, 10 months after it was launched.  The idea behind the implementation of the SFU was a joint effort by multiple major corporations and government agencies.  The ones that were involved with the launch were Institute of Space and Astronautical Science, the National Space Development Agency, and Ministry of International Trade and Industry.

After the shuttle returned the SFU from space it was transported to Japan and refurbished for display at the National Museum of Nature and Science in Tokyo.

Purpose 

The original purposes behind the SFU were to

 Allow researchers better access to space research conditions.
 Give researchers a group experimental facility.
 Be able to reuse the SFU to save money
 Retrieve data

Technology 

A variety of systems that were operational within the SFU had never been implemented before. Equipment on board supported an infrared telescope, two-dimensional solar array, high voltage solar array, space plasma diagnosis, electric propulsion, material experimentation, gas dynamics, gradient heating chemicals, isothermal heating furnace and more.  The core system that was built into the SFU contained an octagonal aluminum truss.  Inside of that were eight boxes of trapezoidal shape.  The SFU was connected directly to the Kagoshima Space Center.

Experimentation data 

There were a number of various types of experiments that were performed on board the SFU during its launch life cycle.  Those experiments, and light data related to them are listed below.

 Infrared Telescope in Space (IRTS) - The IRTS experiment was performed by the infrared telescope that was aboard the SFU.  The intent was to produce important information into the history of the universe and structure of the milky way galaxy.  The telescope had a super fluid helium cooling fan built into it to prevent it from overheating.
 2D Array - The 2d array system was launched as a small module inside of the SFU.  This experiment was deployed to show that large structures could (in fact) be built in space.
 HVSA - The Solar Array was a power source put into this system to head up multiple experiments.  It is used to test the creation of "electricity" in the denseness of space from the use of technology only.
 SPDP - This was used on the SFU to test things going really fast in space.  SPDP stands for (Space Plasma Diagnostic Package) and it was deployed with different sensors to check the effects of speed on the denseness of gravity.
 EPEX - This hardware that was built into the SFU was meant to do experiments related to fuel creation and management in space.
 MEX - This software was meant to review and research the effects of various types of liquid within a space environment.
 BIO - This test involved observing Japanese fire belly newt eggs hatch in deep space.

See also

List of largest infrared telescopes

References

Further reading

External links 

 ISAS Data
 Data Page

Satellites of Japan
Spacecraft launched in 1995
Infrared telescopes
Space hardware returned to Earth intact